Blato may refer to the following places:

Bosnia and Herzegovina
 Hutovo Blato
 Mostarsko Blato
 Blato, a former župa of the medieval Bosnian state, covering territory of present-day Mostarsko Blato

Bulgaria
 Blato, Bulgaria, a village near Nevestino, Kyustendil Province
 Blato River, a river in western Bulgaria, a left tributary of the Iskar

Croatia
 Blato, Korčula, a municipality on the island Korčula
 Blato, Mljet, a village on the island Mljet
 Blato, Zagreb, a neighborhood in Novi Zagreb
 Blato na Cetini, a place in the Split-Dalmatia County

Czech Republic
 Blato, a village and part of Mikulovice (Pardubice District) in the Pardubice Region
 Blato, a village and part of Nová Bystřice in the South Bohemian Region

Serbia
 Blato (Pirot)
 Blato (Sjenica)

Slovenia
 Blato, Slovenske Konjice, a settlement in northeastern Slovenia
 Blato, Trebnje, a settlement in southeastern Slovenia
 Gorenje Blato, a settlement in central Slovenia
 Spodnje Blato, a settlement in central Slovenia